Pullman Hotels and Resorts is a French multinational upscale hotel brand owned by Accor. Pullman has 110 hotels and resorts in 33 countries in Europe, Africa, the Middle-East, Asia Pacific, Australia and Latin America.

History

Railroad origins 

The name Pullman was indirectly inspired by George Pullman (1831–1897), founder of the Pullman Company, a prosperous 19th-century, Chicago-based railroad manufacturer. The Pullman Company was famous for launching the first sleeping trains in the United States and developing upscale services for railroad travelers. Belgian Georges Nagelmackers (1845–1905) traveled to the United States in 1867-1868 and came back with the plan to build the equivalent of the Pullman Company in Europe, the Compagnie Internationale des Wagons-Lits (CIWL).

The fast-growing railroad networks led the rail industry to invest in the construction and management of hotels alongside railroad tracks. In 1894, the CIWL created the Compagnie Internationale des Grands Hotels to manage its growing collection of hotels worldwide, which included the Hôtel Terminus in Bordeaux and Marseille, the Pera Palace Hotel in Istanbul, the Hôtel de la Plage in Ostend, and the Grand Hôtel des Wagons-Lits in Beijing. 30 years later, the CIWL introduced the Pullman wagons in Europe, which were designed for upscale leisure traveling. The Pullman brand became so popular that CIWL's top hotels were turned into Pullman Hotels.

15-year hiatus, 2007 revival 

In June 1990, the AccorHotels group bought a minority stake in CIWL. After fully acquiring CIWL in 1991, AccorHotels turned all Pullman Hotels into Sofitel Hotels in 1993, thus taking the Pullman brand off the market.

In 2007, AccorHotels revived the upscale Pullman hotel brand to cater to business travelers.

The 24-storey Pullman Dubai Mall of the Emirates (MoE) Hotel, the first of Pullman's properties in the Middle East, opened in 2010. Its fourth property in the region, the Pullman Dubai Jumeirah Lakes Towers, opened in 2015. In 2012, Pullman Hotels announced 12 openings in Indonesia within 5 years, opened its first property in the UK (the Pullman London St Pancras) and in Vietnam, and China became its biggest market. By 2013, Pullman had opened 79 properties, half of those located in the Asia-Pacific region.

2013 New brand experience 
In 2013, Pullman Hotels adopted a new visual identity, a new strategy based on artistic, culinary and visual experiences, and the new motto "Work hard, play hard". Pullman hotels adopted new staff uniforms, a new kitchen concept, newly designed interiors, and up-to-date technology upgrades. The new logo was inspired by the yin/yang symbol, a reflection of the business/leisure duality. AccorHotels also announced the plan to reach 150 Pullman Hotels and Resorts by 2020.

In 2014, the AccorHotels group announced its intent to double its Asia-Pacific portfolio with the opening of 47 new Pullman hotels in the region, 38 of those in China. That same year, the 338-room Pullman Shanghai South opened, making it the 15th Pullman property in China, and the 45th in Asia-Pacific.  In 2015, the Sofitel Miami Airport was turned into a Pullman hotel, the first Pullman property in North America. By the end of 2015, 95 Pullman locations were opened. The first property of Pullman in Japan, the Pullman Tokyo Tamachi, opened in 2018.

In 2017, Pullman launched the Artist Playground program in Brussels, where every Pullman hotel independently looks for local talents to exhibit their art. The hotel managers and the art magazine Wallpaper took part in the curation process.

Activities 

Pullman Hotels & Resorts is a chain of upscale hotels with 117 properties in 33 countries. Pullman Hotels & Resorts is part of the Luxury Brands Collection of the hotel group AccorHotels, alongside Raffles, Sofitel,  Fairmont, and MGallery.

See also

Hôtel Terminus

References

External links

 

 
Hotels established in 2007
Hospitality companies of Hong Kong
Accor